Sesshu Foster (born April 5, 1957) is an American poet and novelist.

Sesshu Foster is a Japanese-American poet of white and Nisei descent. He grew up on Los Angeles’ East Side and came of age in the primarily Chicano neighborhood of City Terrace, where he was influenced by local community organizing and political artmaking. Foster credits moving to City Terrace the same year as the Watts Riots (1965) with helping to shape his writing voice and ongoing creative/personal concerns with social and racial justice and the impacts of gentrification.

Personal life 
Al-Jazeera America says of Foster:

Foster met his wife, an East LA Chicana, on a high school science trip and just kept “following Dolores,” says his cousin Tom Ogawa. In college, Foster stayed tied to Bravo while bouncing from one University of California campus to another. His jobs were as varied: In Palo Alto, he was a strip-club bouncer; in Colorado, a summer firefighter — the best gig he’s ever had, he says. “I was reading Mao, Stalin, Che Guevara, anybody, Carey McWilliams or novels or whatever and waiting around for fires. And then you get called out on fires… There’s a certain element of risk to keep you on your toes.” He only quit on account of their firstborn, Marina, who arrived when his wife was a graduate student in Seattle. “I wasn’t going to do what my dad did, which was never be there.” After Marina came Umeko, then Lali — three daughters spaced almost 12 years apart. The girls were raised on their parents’ schoolteacher salaries, first in a house near City Terrace, then in Alhambra. Between his work schedule and young children’s needs, writing became a jigsaw, which was just as well for someone who refused to be “a lonely poet writing in an attic, starving.” There were unclaimed minutes here and there, around the edges of family, teaching and the teachers’ union. On Saturdays, Bravo gave Foster time to write. Summer breaks were sacred. Foster’s craft is inseparable from his day job and family: “None of the work I’ve done would have been done without our collectivity,” he says.

His mother, a second-generation Japanese-American, still lives in City Terrace. According to Al-Jazeera America his mother brought the he and his siblings to the neighborhood after leaving their father, a Beat-era painter.

Career

Foster has taught composition and literature in East LA since 1985, and has also taught at the University of Iowa, the California Institute of the Arts, the University of California, Santa Cruz and the Jack Kerouac School's Summer Writing Program.

He was in residence at California State University, Los Angeles.

He has taught composition and literature in East L.A. for 30 years (LA taco interview). He holds an MFA from the Iowa Writer’s Workshop, where he also taught; he has also been an instructor at the California Institute for the Arts and the University of California, Santa Cruz. Before beginning his teaching career, Foster worked as a firefighter in Colorado’s Rocky Mountains and in Wyoming for several seasons.

Foster’s work has been published in The Oxford Anthology of Modern American Poetry, Language for a New Century: Poetry from the Middle East, Asia and Beyond, and State of the Union: 50 Political Poems.

His most recent books include: Atomik Aztex, a novel; World Ball Notebook; and City of the Future. Forthcoming in 2020 is a second work of speculative fiction, ELADATL: A History of the East Los Angeles Dirigible Air Transport Lines.

Teaching, Firefighting, and Other Careers 
While Foster has boasted work as a strip-club bouncer and a summer firefighter in Colorado, his life as a teacher who poets has been the most consistent. Foster has taught writing at the University of Iowa, California Institute for the Arts, the Jack Kerouac School’s Summer Writing Program, the University of California, Santa Cruz, and English for a number of years at a school in Boyle Heights before beginning his long-tenured career in 1985 as a composition and literature in East L.A. at the Francisco Bravo Medical Magnet High School. There he is active in the teacher’s union and notes that his life as a teacher and poet are a collaborative work with his wife, Dolores Bravo.

Foster notes that his earlier careers are marked by books that were transformational: The Dharma Bums by Jack Kerouac (Penguin) compelled him to enter fire fighting. He became a fire lookout and “I wound up fighting forest fires in Colorado and Wyoming. Way more exciting. Pays for college, too!” When he was 19 working as a bouncer, he made his first attempt at reading Herman Melville’s master work Moby Dick. Of the experience, he says, “I didn't get it. But read the University of California Press edition: it's like NOT getting struck by lightning while a lightning storm strikes all around you on the north edge of the Grand Canyon.” (Hyphen Magazine, Summer 2006)

Awards
2019 Firecracker Award from Council of Literary Magazines and Presses for City of the Future
2010 American Book Award for World Ball Notebook
 2009 Asian American Literary Award for Poetry for World Ball Notebook
 2005 Believer Book Award for Atomik Aztex
 1990 American Book Award for Invocation LA: Urban Multicultural Poetry
 finalist for a PEN Center West Poetry Prize, for City Terrace Field Manual
 finalist for the Paterson Poetry Prize for City Terrace Field Manual

Writing 
Foster’s work draws from the identities he holds close as husband and father as much as being an activist and eternal son of East LA. All of this culminates in an imperative to resist “the apartheid imagination.” Is it holistic/hybrid writing and-as living? Regardless, his work elicits a study in the political imperatives of the writer. On his blog, he uses syntax and other aspects of the visual to re-center the voices he hears and sees in his community. In “review of ‘made in l.a.’ at the ucla hammer museum,” Foster brings his critiquing gaze to seethe and mourn the omission of artists of color in an exhibit lauded by critics. The poem is at once a litany of absence as memory as much as it speaks to a firm disagreement with a present (and president) who echo the same histories he experienced 20 years before (excerpted):it’s okay that the artists are all white, even the nonwhite artists (2?) are kind of white

it’s okay that the curators are all white, it’s

okay that the l.a. reflected in this show is like the l.a. in robert altman’s “shortcuts” which is a strange all-white l.a.

(in charlton heston’s “omega man,” (1971) i think the head vampire or whatever they were who was menacing the ‘real’ last human beings on earth, that is the humans who were not vampires or whatever (all white, except maybe the black woman hipster with her militant afro) was black)

let’s not go into “planet of the apes” at this juncture, but in the apartheid imagination of the future white people are in peril, isolated with jutting jaw of manifest destiny determination like charlton heston with his guns and his alzheimer’s

it’s okay that the curators at the ucla hammer museum think that ‘minorities’ are best represented by white queer artists (that shows diversity like on “star trek” the aliens are white people who wear prosthetic make-up or paint their skin blue or green—that’s a kind of diversity)

it’s okay that the white artists who are queer artists don’t have anything to do with POC (people of color)

it’s okay in the little museum labels where the curators note the background, issues and ideas in the artist’s work, that none of it referenced POC even when it mentioned “highest rates of incarceration in the world in spite of having only 5% of the worlds population” (it’s okay not to mention that blacks and latinos make up 60% of the incarcerated even though they are 30% of the american people)

it’s okay

it’s all right, like when i sat in one day in marilyn robinson’s mfa writing class at the university of iowa and she shared her course reading list which was all white except for one book by the only black writer and only POC in creative writing at U of I, and she asked did anyone have any remarks or suggestions, and i said, apart from the one, the reading list isn’t very diverse, it’s all white Though Foster is known as a poet, he has published two experimental novels and edited an anthology. His work often employs experimental or hybrid formal constraints (in World Ball Notebook, the conceit of the “game”; the prose poems of City Terrace Field Manual; the speculative hybrid novel forms in both Atomik Aztex and ELADATL.)

In addition, Foster is a prolific postcard writer. It all began when he was a child and exchanged letters with his father. In those days, he’d mail up to twenty postcards in a single week covering everything from sports and diary entries, to family life and other day-to-day happenings. Apart from his father, Foster also utilizes post cards and postcard poems to his friends and loved ones, like Lisa Chen a fellow writer who met Foster in Iowa. To Foster, postcard poems are “a form of diary or journaling, reflection— and also a way of saying ‘hi’ to people from far.” Additionally, Foster notest that postcard poems afford “often arbitrary juxtaposition” of image and text in a non-linear, and non-standardized manner. This mode of nonlinear epistolary writing great influenced Foster’s City of The Future (Kaya Press 2018). Foster describes the role of postcard poems in this collection as: “Postcards written with ocotillo and yucca. Gentrification of your face inside your sleep. Privatization of identity, corners, and intimations. Wars on the nerve, colors, breathing. Postcard poems of early and late notes, mucilage, American loneliness. Postcard poems of slopes, films of dust and crows. Incarceration nation ‘Wish You Were Here’ postcards 35 cents emerge from gentrified pants. You can’t live like this. Postcards sent into the future. You can’t live here now; you must live in the future, in the City of the Future.” In this manner, postcard poems can be seen as an attempt to regain control of lost places, streets, and places, to document and retain the lives and neighborhoods that are in danger of imminent consumption and loss.

Articles & Poems 

 “Letter Before Leaving for a Reforestation Brigade,” Minnesota Review, 1986
 “This Poem Cannot Be Written,” Radical Teacher, 1987
 “from Visitation: Sites Where the Essence of the Soul Has Been Extracted,” Radical Teacher, 1987
 “The Organic Garden Was Indeed Beautiful,” “This Poem Cannot Be Written,” “Chico?,“ “Visitation: Sites Where the Essence of the Soul Has Been Extracted,” “Sometimes,” The Journal of Ethnic Studies, 1987
 "High Blood/Pressure," Off Our Backs, 1988
 “Fresh Harvest: New Multicultural Poetry,” Northwest Review, 1990
 "The Marl of the New Diaspora: Premonitions; The Kaya Anthology of New Asian North American Poetry, edited by Walter K. Lew," rev. by Mira Chieko Shimabukuro, International Examiner, 1996 (anthology)
 Another City: Writing from Los Angeles, edited by David L. Ulin., 2001 (anthology)
 “Interview with Juan Fish (Supposedly),” Mandorla: Nueva Escritura de las Américas, 2009
 “review of “made in l.a.” at the ucla hammer museum,” personal blog, 2014
 “Movie Version,” Latinx Writing Los Angeles, University of Nebraska Press, 2018

Selected works
Angry Days. West End Press. 1987. 
Akrilica. Juan Felipe Herrera, translated by Stephen Kessler & Sesshu Foster with Dolores Bravo, Magaly Fernandez. Alcatraz Editions, 1989.

American Loneliness: Selected Poems (Beyond Baroque, 2006)

City of the Future. Kaya Press. 2018. 
ELADATL: A History of the East Los Angeles Dirigible Air Transport Lines (City Lights Publishers, 2021, April 6) .

Anthologies

References

External links
"Sesshu Foster", Modern American Poetry
Excerpts from World Ball Notebook
ELAguide 
Salon.com audio, City Terrace Field Manual
"Author's blog"

Living people
American male poets
University of Iowa faculty
Writers from Los Angeles
American writers of Japanese descent
1957 births
American poets
American male novelists
University of California, Santa Cruz faculty
Believer Book Award winners
20th-century American poets
American Book Award winners
20th-century American male writers
Novelists from Iowa
American poets of Asian descent
American novelists of Asian descent